Maya Even (born 24 May 1961), is a Canadian-born, British-based, university lecturer, journalist and television presenter.

Biography
Born in Canada, and educated at McGill University, Montreal, and St Antony's College, University of Oxford where she first arrived in 1979 and completed a doctoral thesis entitled The Evolution of Political Television and its Influence on Election Campaigning in Britain.

After a period as a university lecturer, Even began her television career at TV-am in 1987, first as a researcher in the political unit and then as a producer and reporter from 1989, mainly from Westminster. In 1990, she took over from Richard Keys as regular host of the early show and began deputising for Lorraine Kelly on Good Morning Britain. She also fronted the revamped First Report and covered for David Frost with Even on Sunday, which ranged across politics, the arts and sport.

In 1993, she joined Channel 4 to present the lunchtime daily political programme House to House, and in 1997 moved to BBC Two to present The Money Programme for two years.

Even is a governor and former Vice Chair of the South Bank Centre, and a member of the Mayor's Cultural Strategy Group for Mayor of London Ken Livingstone. Even was nominated by Livingstone as the Greater London Authority representative for the London Museums Agency.

Even is married to Italian-born London based art dealer Edmondo di Robilant, the couple have one child. Their home featured in Robb Report magazine.

References

External links
Bio at TV-am
Robb Report article on her London home

1961 births
Living people
Alumni of St Antony's College, Oxford
BBC newsreaders and journalists
Canadian expatriates in England
Canadian television journalists
McGill University alumni
Canadian women television journalists
Canadian women radio presenters